Buffalo City may refer to:

Places

South Africa 
Buffalo City Metropolitan Municipality

United States 
Buffalo City, Arkansas
Buffalo City, North Carolina
Buffalo City, Wisconsin

See also 

 Buffalo (disambiguation)

